FC Malcantone Agno was a Swiss association football club based in Lugano. The club was established in 1955 but merged with FC Lugano in 2004. In its last season of existence, the team played in the second tier of Swiss football, the Nationalliga B, now known as the Swiss Challenge League.

History 
Formed on July 1, 1955, Malcantone Agno played primarily in the fourth tier of Swiss football. The club played its home games in the Centro Sportivo Passera, which offered space for 1,280 spectators. It was not until the 1998/99 season, under coach Silvano Gaffuri, the club was promoted to Swiss 1. Liga. The club were champions of the 1. Liga in the 2001/02 season under new Bosnian-Swiss coach Vladimir Petković but were defeated in the promotion playoffs 2 - 4 on aggregate against SC Young Fellows Juventus. However, they were promoted the following season having defeated FC La Chaux-de-Fonds 3-2 on aggregate. 

In the 2003-04 season, their first season in the Nationalliga B, the club moved stadium to the Stadio Cornaredo which had been used by newly declared bankrupt FC Lugano. The club's debut season was relatively successful, finishing fourth with a strong spine built around Alberto Regazzoni and Yane Bugnard (who scored eleven goals each), future national goalkeeper Germano Vailati in goal and ex-international Régis Rothenbühler in defense. 

That was to be the final season for the club as it merged with the bankrupt FC Lugano, to become AC Lugano. Vladimir Petković became the trainer of the new club and Malcantone president Giuseppe Morotti, became the new club president. The club's logo was incorporated into the lower end of AC Lugano's coat of arms.

Former players 

 Alberto Regazzoni 
 Germano Vailati 
 Marco Padalino 
 Yane Bugnard

Former Managers 

  Silvano Gaffuri (1993-1999) 
  Vladimir Petković (1999-2004)

External links
 AC Lugano website

Football clubs in Switzerland
Sport in Ticino
Association football clubs established in 1955
Association football clubs disestablished in 2004
Defunct football clubs in Switzerland
1955 establishments in Switzerland
2004 disestablishments in Switzerland